Xavier F. Salomon (born 1979) is a British art critic and both Deputy Director and Peter Jay Sharp Chief Curator at the Frick Collection in New York. Born in Rome to an English mother and Danish father, he has British citizenship and is most notable for his expertise on Paolo Veronese. From April 2020 through July 2021, Salomon hosted an online program "Cocktails with a Curator" with Frick curators Aimee Ng and Giulio Dalvit. The program examined artworks at the Frick and had 66 episodes, which are available on YouTube and are the basis of a book.

Works
 2009 – Paolo Veronese: The Petrobelli Altarpiece
 2010 – Masterpieces of European Painting from Dulwich Picture Gallery
 2012 – Van Dyck in Sicily: 1624–1625 Painting and the Plague
 2014 – Goya and the Altamira Family
 2014 – Veronese (catalogue of an exhibition at the National Gallery, London)
 2016 – Van Dyck: The Anatomy of Portraiture
 2016 – The Art of Guido Cagnacci
 2017 – Veronese in Murano: Two Venetian Renaissance Masterpieces Restored
 2017 – Murillo: The Self-Portraits (with Letizia Treves)
 2018 – Holbein's Sir Thomas More (with Hilary Mantel)
 2019 – Rembrandt's Polish Rider (with Maira Kalman)
 2020 – Titian's Pietro Aretino (with Francine Prose)
 2022 – Fragonard's Progress of Love (with Alan Hollinghurst)
 2022 – Paolo Veneziano’s Coronation of the Virgin (with Nico Muhly) 
 2022 – Cocktails with a Curator: The Frick Collection (with Aimee Ng and Giulio Dalvit)

References

British people of Danish descent
British art historians
British art critics
British curators
1979 births
Living people
Employees of the Frick Collection
Alumni of the Courtauld Institute of Art